This is a list of churches in  Gladsaxe Municipality, Greater Copenhagen, Denmark.

Church of Denmark

See also
 List of churches in Gentofte Municipality

References

External links

 
Lists of buildings and structures in Copenhagen
Gladsaxe